William "Bill" Thomas Tyler was a New Zealand rugby footballer who was part of the professional 1907-1908 New Zealand rugby tour of Great Britain. His older brother George Tyler also played rugby for City and Auckland, and represented the All Blacks 36 times from 1903 to 1906.

Rugby Football
He started his career playing rugby union for the City Club in Auckland. Tyler was a Scrum-Half but also played at Wing-Forward, a position that had already been abandoned in other countries. Aged 25, he was selected for Auckland in 1905 and was part of the team that won the Ranfurly Shield from Wellington. Tyler had scored the winning try and was well known for this deed.

Rugby League
In 1907 Tyler joined the professional All Blacks in their tour of Great Britain and Australia. Like the rest of the touring party Tyler was banned for life by the New Zealand Rugby Union. While on tour he played in six test matches and scored the match winning try in the third test against Great Britain. He then played in the first ever trans-Tasman test which was the debut match of the Australia national rugby league team. In all tour games Tyler scored three tries.

Following the tour's return to New Zealand Tyler became one of the founding member of the Ponsonby United Rugby League Club in 1908 alongside fellow tourist Charles Dunning. He also played for Auckland and was part of the first ever provincial rugby league match in New Zealand, in which Auckland defeated Wellington 16-14.

Death
Tyler died while under anaesthetic due to respiratory failure. He had been ill for quite some time. He was working as a blacksmith and living at Nihotupu in West Auckland at the time of his death.

References

New Zealand rugby union players
Auckland rugby union players
New Zealand rugby league players
New Zealand national rugby league team players
Ponsonby Ponies players
Auckland rugby league team players
Rugby league centres
Rugby league five-eighths
Rugby league halfbacks
Rugby union scrum-halves
Rugby union wing-forwards